"Beautiful Onyinye" is a song by Nigerian duo P-Square. It features a rap verse from American rapper Rick Ross. The song originally appeared on their fifth studio album, The Invasion (2011). P-Square recorded the song shortly after signing partnership deals with Akon's Konvict Muzik and Universal Music Group.

Background and recording
In an interview with Okay Nigeria TV, the duo said they were with Akon in Atlanta when Rick Ross visited the studio. While playing the original song, Rick Ross told them he loves the song's vibe. Akon then suggested to the duo that they collaborate with Rick Ross. The duo agreed and told their manager, Jude Engees Okoye. After speaking with Rick Ross' manager, the deal was finalized. When asked about the video shoot, the duo loosely said, "We shot Rick Ross' scenes in Miami and shot the rest of the video in South Africa in order to maintain our African identity".

Live performances

On August 26, 2012, P-Square performed "Beautiful Onyinye" at the Love AfroBeats Festival, at a concert they headlined. The duo also performed the song to a sold out crowd at the HMV Apollo.

Accolades
The music video for "Beautiful Onyinye" was nominated for Best Afro Pop and Video of the Year at the 2012 Nigeria Music Video Awards (NMVA).

Release history

References

2012 songs
2012 singles
P-Square songs
Rick Ross songs